The Jiangmen Underground Neutrino Observatory (JUNO) is a medium baseline reactor neutrino experiment under construction at Kaiping, Jiangmen in Guangdong province in Southern China.  It aims to determine the neutrino mass hierarchy and perform precision measurements of the Pontecorvo–Maki–Nakagawa–Sakata matrix elements.  It will build on the mixing parameter results of many previous experiments.  The collaboration was formed in July 2014 and construction began January 10, 2015. The schedule aims to begin taking data in 2023.  Funding is provided by the Chinese Academy of Sciences, but the collaboration is international.

Planned as a follow-on to the Daya Bay Reactor Neutrino Experiment, it was originally to be sited in the same area, but the construction of a third nuclear reactor (the Lufeng Nuclear Power Plant) in that region would disrupt the experiment, which depends on maintaining a fixed distance to nearby nuclear reactors.  Instead it was moved west to a site (Jingji town, Kaiping, Jiangmen) located 53 km from both of the Yangjiang and Taishan nuclear power plants.

Detector 
The main detector consists of a  diameter transparent acrylic glass sphere containing 20,000 tonnes of linear alkylbenzene liquid scintillator, surrounded by a stainless steel truss supporting approximately 53,000 photomultiplier tubes (17,000 large  diameter tubes, and 36,000  tubes filling in the gaps between them), immersed in a water pool instrumented with 2000 additional photomultiplier tubes as a muon veto. As of 2022, construction of the detector is well underway. Deploying this  underground will detect neutrinos with excellent energy resolution.  The overburden includes 270 m of granite mountain, which will reduce cosmic muon background.

The much larger distance to the reactors (compared to less than 2 km for the Daya Bay far detector) makes the experiment better able to distinguish neutrino oscillations, but requires a much larger, and better-shielded, detector to detect a sufficient number of reactor neutrinos.

Physics 

The main approach of the JUNO Detector in measuring neutrino oscillations is the observation of electron-antineutrinos coming from two nuclear power plants at approximately 53 km distance.  Since the expected rate of neutrinos reaching the detector is known from processes in the power plants, the absence of a certain neutrino flavor can give an indication of transition processes.

Although not the primary goal, the detector is sensitive to atmospheric neutrinos, geoneutrinos and neutrinos from supernovae as well.

Expected sensitivity 
Daya Bay and RENO measured θ13 and determined it has a large non-zero value.  Daya Bay will be able to measure the value to ≈4% precision and RENO ≈7% after several years.  JUNO is designed to improve uncertainty in several neutrino parameters to less than 1%.

See also 
 Daya Bay
 RENO
 Double Chooz
 KamLAND
 NOνA
 Wang Yifang

References

External links 
 Jiangmen Underground Neutrino Observatory web site
 JUNO at Shanghai Jiao Tong University
 JUNO documents at INFN
 

Physics experiments
Underground laboratories
Neutrino observatories
Science and technology in China